Buen Consejo is a subbarrio, a subdivision of Pueblo, a barrio in San Juan, Puerto Rico. It was, at one time, a subdivision of Río Piedras, a former municipality of Puerto Rico.

References

Pueblo, San Juan, Puerto Rico
Municipality of San Juan